This is a list of television programs broadcast by Joi in Italy.

Programs 
Aliens in America
Cold Case
ER
Everwood
Finalmente arriva Kalle (Da kommt Kalle)
Grandi Domani
House
I Cesaroni (Italian version of Los Serrano)
Il Mammo
L.A. Heat
La Strana Coppia
Law & Order: Criminal Intent
Law & Order: Special Victims Unit
Law & Order: Trial by Jury
Life
Malcolm in the Middle
The Middle
Monk
The Nine
Royal Pains
Step by Step
Two and a Half Men
The War at Home
The West Wing

Mediaset
Programmes Joi
Joi